Randolph Samuel Williams (October 26, 1912 – August 11, 1980), also known as Mas Ran and Ranny Williams,  was a Jamaican comedian and actor. Born in Colón, Panama, he moved to Jamaica with his mother when he was six. He hosted television shows, appeared in movies and teamed with Louise Bennett for a show.

Williams is honored at the National Heroes Park in Kingston. The Ranny Williams Entertainment Centre, which includes the Ranny Williams Amphitheatre with seating for 2,500 persons and the Louise Bennett Garden Theatre, is named for him.

References

1912 births
1980 deaths
20th-century comedians
Male comedians
Jamaican comedians
Place of death missing
Panamanian emigrants to Jamaica